Swinnen is a surname. Notable people with the surname include:

 Émile Swinnen, Belgian hurdler
 Firmin Swinnen (1885–1972), Belgian theater organist and concert artist
 Tibeau Swinnen (born 1995), Belgian footballer

See also
 Swinney